No No Sleep is a 2015 mainland China—Taiwan—Hong Kong short film by Taiwanese film director Tsai Ming-liang, winning Best Director at the Taipei Film Awards in 2015. It features Taiwanese actor Lee Kang-sheng and Japanese actor Masanobu Andō, and includes non-sexual full-frontal male nudity.

Plot
No No Sleep consists of a series of scenes filmed with a static camera and without dialogue in a variety of urban locations, such as train tracks, a subway train, a bath-house and a sleep chamber.

See also
 List of Chinese films of 2015
 Nudity in film (East Asian cinema since 1929)

References

External links
 China version (Censored)
 International version (Uncensored)

2015 short films
Chinese short films
Films directed by Tsai Ming-liang
Films set in Japan
Films shot in Japan
Taiwanese short films
Films without speech
Japan in non-Japanese culture